San Cipriano d'Aversa is an Italian commune and municipality in the Province of Caserta, region of Campania, located about  northwest of Naples and about  southwest of Caserta. The town is located on the territory of Agro aversano - a rural area with 19 comunes spread on its land, and is directly linked to the comune of Casal di Principe on a side, to the comune of Casapesenna on the other side.

San Cipriano d’Aversa is also known for the export of buffalo mozzarella and for the strong presence of organised crime.

References

Cities and towns in Campania